Sir Malcolm Campbell Macnaughton  (4 April 1925 – 1 July 2016) was a Scottish obstetrician and gynaecologist, Emeritus Professor of Obstetrics and Gynaecology, and an influential voice in promoting legislation allowing for experimentation on early embryos.

Macnaughton was president of the Royal College of Obstetricians and Gynaecologists from 1984 to 1987.

In 1986 Macnaughton was knighted for his services to obstetrics and gynaecology.

Macnaughton was president of the British Fertility Society, from 1992 to 1995.

References

External links 

 

1925 births
2016 deaths
Academics of the University of Glasgow
Knights Bachelor
Scottish gynaecologists
Scottish obstetricians